Pennco Tech is a private for-profit technical school in Bristol, Pennsylvania, and Blackwood, New Jersey. It was founded in 1973.

Academics
Pennco Tech awards certificates and diplomas in healthcare and technology fields. At Pennco Tech, all programs and areas of study have local advisory boards composed of industry business personnel assembled to make sure curriculum encompasses real-world need and experience. The school is accredited by the Accrediting Commission of Career Schools and Colleges of Technology.

Campuses

Pennco Tech Bristol Campus
Pennco Tech's Bristol, Pennsylvania campus is located at 3815 Otter St, Bristol, PA 19007. The Pennco Tech Bristol campus offers a plumbing and heating curriculum not available at Pennco Tech's Blackwood campus.

Pennco Tech Blackwood Campus
Pennco Tech's Blackwood, New Jersey campus is located at 99 Erial Rd, Blackwood, NJ 08012. The Pennco Tech Blackwood campus offers Diesel/Truck Technology curriculum not available at Pennco Tech's Bristol campus.

References

External links

Educational institutions established in 1973
For-profit universities and colleges in the United States
Technical schools
Vocational education in the United States
Universities and colleges in Camden County, New Jersey
Universities and colleges in Bucks County, Pennsylvania
1973 establishments in Pennsylvania
Gloucester Township, New Jersey